The Gun Carrier Mark I was a British vehicle of the First World War. The gun carrier was designed to transport a 6-inch howitzer or a 60-pounder gun forward soon after an attack to support infantry in advanced positions. Gun carriers were first used in the Battle of Pilckem Ridge (31 July – 2 August 1917) during the Third Battle of Ypres (31 July – 10 November 1917). The carriers moved guns and equipment but were used for the rest of the war mainly for carrying equipment and supplies through areas under fire, where porters in the open would have suffered many casualties. The 6-inch howitzer could be fired while mounted, making the Gun Carrier Mark I the first modern self-propelled gun, a weapon capable of independent action and having tactical mobility on the battlefield.

Background
In early 1916, the tactical conditions on the Western Front could leave infantry who had captured positions exhausted, disorganised, short of supplies, out of touch with the rear and incapable of defeating a counter-attack. Allied artillery was being moved by tractor and an armoured, tracked vehicle would allow artillery to be moved in areas under German fire. Major John Greg, an engineer working for Metropolitan, Carriage, Wagon and Finance, proposed to build special mechanised artillery, using parts of the Tank Mark I. Greg began work on a design with Major Walter Wilson, an inventor who had worked on the Tank Mark I, on 7 March. At first, carriage of the BL 6-inch howitzer, 8-inch howitzer or the 60-pounder gun (5-inch) was envisaged but the idea of transporting the 8-inch howitzer was dropped. On 3 March 1917, the prototype was tested at Oldbury with other experimental vehicles at a Tank Trials Day.

Design

The gun carrier was operated by a commander, driver and two gearsmen. An armoured box enclosed the rear half of the vehicle, overhanging the tracks which ran through a gap. The front half of the machine had a platform for a gun with two armoured cabs, one for the driver and one for the commander, above the tracks at the front on each side.

There was no room for track spuds to be attached, and in tests it was found that mud and debris clogged the track runs, pierced the superstructure and holed the radiators above them. A 6-inch howitzer or a 60-pounder gun could be winched backwards onto the gun platform at the front and secured, the wheels being removed and hung over the sides of the gun carrier. The armoured box at the back accommodated an eight-man gun crew and each vehicle carried a machine-gun.

Production

Gun Carrier Mark I

Work by Greg and Wilson began on 7 March 1916 but only with GHQ approval, which was received on 17 May 1916. The Ordnance Board refused to approve the design on 15 June 1916 and Albert Stern, the Secretary of the Landship Committee appealed to David Lloyd George, the Minister of Munitions. Lloyd George over-ruled the Board and unilaterally placed an order for fifty vehicles the next day. On 29 May 1917 the War Office ordered

The prototype was built by the Metropolitan Carriage, Wagon & Finance Co. and was finished on 1 January 1917. An order was placed with Kitson & Co. in Leeds for 49 gun carriers (changed to 47 gun carriers and two salvage vehicles on 16 October 1917). Trials of the prototype began around 2 February 1917 and at Shoeburyness ranges the 60-pounder was fired from the carrier. Six gun carriers and the two salvage vehicles were delivered to the army in the second quarter of 1917,  the third quarter,  the fourth quarter and the last five in the first quarter of 1918 at a price of £168,000 for the carriers and £10,000 for the two salvage vehicles.

Salvage vehicles

The two forward driving cabs were removed, the carrying platform was covered and a hand-crane to lift -loads on a jib or  using shear legs. The box had a cab in front, behind which was a winding drum connected to the engine for hauling with a wire hawser; the price of the two vehicles was £10,000. In December a third vehicle was equipped with a Priestman Brothers clamshell steam-grab. David Fletcher suggests this was the track chassis of the prototype Gun Carrier

Gun Carrier Mark II

A revised Gun Carrier Mark II was designed but only a mock-up was built. The hull covered two-thirds of the length of the vehicle and the carrying platform was moved to the back. The front end was built on similar lines to Tank Marks IV and V, with the tracks raised at the front for climbing obstacles. The vehicle was to be powered by a 150-hp Ricardo engine through epicyclic gears. Guns would be embarked at the rear and retain their wheels but not fire from the vehicle.

Operational service

1917

Gun Carrier  arrived in France before the Third Battle of Ypres (31 July – 10 November 1917) and was attached to XVIII Corps for field trials. The gun carrier was first used at the Battle of Pilckem Ridge (31 July – 2 August 1917) and the steering tail was soon dispensed with. During the fighting in Flanders, the carrier brought several hundred tons of ammunition and several 60-pounder guns forward. As supply tanks, the gun carriers had much greater capacity than converted Mark I and Mark IV tanks and were in constant demand. Seven gun carriers were available for the opening of the Battle of Cambrai on 20 November 1917.

1918
In June 1918, the two gun carrier companies were converted to supply companies and attached to the 3rd and 5th Tank Brigades. As the vehicles returned the crews picked up seventy wounded soldiers and transported them to a dressing station. Four officers and sixteen men transported the equivalent of  the equivalent of about two infantry battalions' worth of stores and equipment. One gun carrier moved  of barbed wire,  pickets,  sheets, fifty tins of water,  bombs,  of ammunition and twenty boxes of hand grenades. When the 1st and 2nd Supply companies reached France, they joined the 1st and 4th Tank Brigades and the 3rd, 4th and 5th Supply companies were posted to Blingel Camp, near Bermicourt which had driving and maintenance facilities. In late July the 3rd and 5th Supply companies were re-equipped with Mark IV supply tanks and Mark IVs with fitments to haul sledges full of supplies. By August the 1st Gun Carrier Company was attached to the 5th Tank Brigade and the 2nd Company to the 3rd Tank Brigade.

The  carriers of the 1st Gun Carrier Company were allotted to the Australian Corps during the Battle of Amiens (8–12 August 1918). On the night of  the 1st Gun Carrier Company drove to an orchard on the west of Villers-Bretonneux carrying explosives. A shell from a German battery near Chipilly ignited a camouflage net on one of the carriers, thick smoke rose and German artillery bombarded the orchard. The vehicle crews and some Australian gunners rescued three carriers which were driven out of danger but the rest exploded; Major W. Partington, commander of the 1st Gun Carrier Company was wounded. When not needed for tank support, the gun carriers shifted engineer stores and ammunition for the infantry, being of great use in areas swept by machine-gun fire. The 2nd Gun Carrier Company carried forward a 6-inch howitzer to conduct harassing fire at night, moving around to deceive the Germans. Several gas attacks were carried out by gun carriers moving Livens projectors and gas bombs over ground too cut up for wheeled vehicles. The cross-country mobility of the gun carriers enabled more bombs to be fired in the dark and the carriers to vacate the area before dawn. For the remainder of the war, gun carriers were in great demand to carry tank supplies over ground unfit for wheeled vehicles. On 18 September, during the Hundred Days Offensive, Australian infantry were so understrength during operations against the Hindenburg outpost-line, that two gun carriers moved supplies to the first objective. Eleven days later, the 5th Tank Supply Company, with  supported the Australian Corps at the Hindenburg Line.

Analysis
Once the gun had been winched aboard and fixed to a cross beam, it was near its usual firing position. In a 2013 publication, John Glanfield described the vehicle as a "dual self-propelled gun/gun carrier". The vehicle had been designed for the 6-inch howitzer, which could be fired from the vehicle and the 60-pounder Mk II, none of which were in France in 1917 and the Mk I had to be disembarked to fire. As supply vehicles, the gun carriers excelled, being able to carry a heavy load on the platform, rather than inconveniently placed inside a converted tank.

References

Bibliography 

Books
 
 
 
 
 
 
 
 

Theses

Further reading

External links

 Gun Carrier Machine Part II
 Gun Carrier Mk.1

Self-propelled artillery of the United Kingdom
World War I self-propelled artillery
Military vehicles introduced in the 1910s
World War I armoured fighting vehicles of the United Kingdom